The kritai katholikoi tōn Rhomaiōn ("universal judges of the Romans") were a supreme court during the late Byzantine Empire.

History
The court had its antecedent in a tribunal of 12 judges, composed of both secular (senatorial) judges and of ecclesiastical members, created by Andronikos II Palaiologos in 1296. It functioned as a supreme court, and there was no appeal from its decisions. The tribunal was reduced to four members, at least one of whom had to be a bishop, by Andronikos III Palaiologos in 1329, and received the name "kritai katholikoi". According to Manuel II Palaiologos, they had authority over all matters; received only written complaints; conducted the hearings, including expert testimony where deemed necessary; and deliberated in seclusion, with the judgement resulting from the majority of opinions. The first four judges were Joseph, Bishop of Apros, Gregory Kleidas, an archdeacon and dikaiophylax, the megas dioiketes Glabas, and Nicholas Matarangos, probably a scholar. They served until a major corruption scandal in 1336/7, of which the first three were found guilty.

Besides the original tribunal resident in the capital Constantinople, similar boards of judges appeared in the course of the 14th century in the Byzantine territories of the Despotate of the Morea, in Thessalonica, and Lemnos, as well as in the Byzantine-influenced Serbian Empire and the Empire of Trebizond.

See also 
 Byzantine law
 Constantine Harmenopoulos

References

Sources

Further reading
 
 

1329 establishments in Europe 
Byzantine judicial offices
Tribunals
14th century in the Byzantine Empire 
14th-century establishments in the Byzantine Empire